Oxossia capitata is a shrub native to the wet tropics of southern Brazil. It was previously classified as Turnera, however, recent phylogenetic analyses suggested the species should be placed in Oxossia. O. capitata has heterostylous white pointed flowers.

References 

Flora of Brazil
Passifloraceae